Lužany may refer to:
Lužany (Jičín District), a village in Jičín District, Czech Republic.
Lužany (Hradec Králové District), a village in Hradec Králové District, Czech Republic.
Lužany (Plzeň-South District), a village and municipality in Plzeň-South District, Czech Republic
Lužany pri Topli, a village and municipality in Svidník District in the Prešov Region of north-eastern Slovakia.
Lužany (Topoľčany), a municipality in the Topoľčany District of the Nitra Region, Slovakia

See also
 Luzan (disambiguation)
 Lužani (disambiguation)